Markus Karl Bengt Gustafsson (born 6 March 1989) is a Swedish footballer who most recently played for IF Brommapojkarna as a midfielder.

References

External links

Brommapojkarna profile 

1989 births
Living people
Association football midfielders
GAIS players
Örgryte IS players
Viborg FF players
Ljungskile SK players
IF Brommapojkarna players
Allsvenskan players
Superettan players
Ettan Fotboll players
Danish Superliga players
Danish 1st Division players
Swedish footballers
Sweden youth international footballers
Swedish expatriate footballers
Swedish expatriate sportspeople in Denmark
Expatriate men's footballers in Denmark